Probable methyltransferase TARBP1 is an enzyme that in humans is encoded by the TARBP1 gene.

HIV-1, the causative agent of acquired immunodeficiency syndrome (AIDS), contains an RNA genome that produces a chromosomally integrated DNA during the replicative cycle. Activation of HIV-1 gene expression by the transactivator Tat is dependent on an RNA regulatory element (TAR) located downstream of the transcription initiation site. This element forms a stable stem-loop structure and can be bound by either the protein encoded by this gene or by RNA polymerase II. This protein may act to disengage RNA polymerase II from TAR during transcriptional elongation. Alternatively spliced transcripts of this gene may exist, but their full-length natures have not been determined.

References

Further reading